Cyathea obtusa is a species of fern in the family Cyatheaceae, native to Trinidad and Tobago, Venezuela (including the Venezuelan Antilles), and the Windward Islands. It was first described by Domin in 1929.

References

obtusa
Flora of Trinidad and Tobago
Flora of Venezuela
Flora of the Venezuelan Antilles
Flora of the Windward Islands
Plants described in 1929